is a Japanese actress and singer.

Background
She graduated from Aoyama Gakuin University. Most well known for her lead role as Otome Sakamoto in T.B.S. drama, Kinpachi-sensei, Hoshino has starred in several dramas in recent years. Her main role in Platonic Sex was somewhat controversial as it was rather contrary to her image as one possessing pure values. She has also published two photographic books as well as about six C.D.s. Of the Japanese dramas shown in Los Angeles, a substantial fraction of them has Mari in the cast.

Filmography

Television
Kinpachi-sensei (1995–2011) – Otome Sakamoto
Eve-Santa Clause Dreaming (1997) – Mika
Thursday Ghost Story (1997, ep 15) – Risa Sonoda
House of the Devils (1999) – Rieko
Live (1999) – Nana Ayukawa
Bus Stop (2000) – Haruka Kitahara
Platonic Sex (2001) – Kana
Shin Hoshi no Kinka (2001) – Mahiru Morita
Ōoku (2004) – Otama / Narrator
 A Happy Birthday (2009) – Natsuki Hoshi

Films
Blooming Again (2004) – Kazuko Inoue
Infection (2004) – Nurse
Sayonara Midori-chan (2005) – Yūko
Keitai Kareshi (2009) – Miki Asanuma
Battlefield Baseball (2011) – Shinnosuke Suzuki
Kaigan-dōri no Neko-mimi Tantei (2022)

References

External links

Profile at JMDb (in Japanese)
Official Site (in Japanese)
At Universal Music Japan (in Japanese)

Japanese child actresses
Aoyama Gakuin University alumni
1981 births
Living people
Japanese idols
Japanese women pop singers
Musicians from Saitama Prefecture
21st-century Japanese singers
21st-century Japanese women singers
Japanese actresses